Creature is the second studio album by Canadian alternative rock band Moist, released in 1996. It featured the singles "Leave it Alone", "Resurrection", "Tangerine", and "Gasoline", all which were hits in Canada. The album was nominated for "Album of the Year" and "Rock Album of the Year" at the 1998 Juno Awards.

Commercial performance
Creature debuted at #7 on The Record's Canadian Albums Chart. The album was certified Triple Platinum in Canada in 1997. Between 1996 and 2016, Creature was among the top 15 best-selling albums by Canadian bands in Canada and among the top 40 best-selling albums by Canadian artists overall in Canada.

Track listing
All songs written by Moist.

Singles
Leave It Alone
Resurrection
Tangerine
Gasoline

Trivia
"Ophelia" is featured on the first edition MuchMusic's Big Shiny Tunes, which was released in 1996.
"Tangerine" won two MMVAs (MuchMusic Video Awards) for "Best Director" and "Best Video" in 1997.

Credits
David Usher – vocals
Mark Makoway – guitars
Kevin Young – keyboards
Jeff Pearce – bass
Paul Wilcox – drums
Matt Watkins – trumpet on "Creature"
Claude Lamothe – cello on "Tangerine"

References

1996 albums
Moist (Canadian band) albums
EMI Records albums
Albums produced by Paul Northfield
Albums recorded at Le Studio